Middle Stewiacke Airport  is an abandoned airport that was located adjacent to the Stewiacke River near Middle Stewiacke, Nova Scotia, Canada.

The airport was listed as abandoned as of 13 April 2006.

References

Defunct airports in Nova Scotia